Northern State Prison is a state run prison located at 168 Frontage Road in Newark, New Jersey for male offenders.  It is operated by the New Jersey Department of Corrections.  Northern State Prison offers community service activities to all minimum security inmates.  The prison also houses the Security Threat Group Management Unit, which provides treatment to inmates affiliated with gangs that threaten the security of the institution.

As of August 1, 2006, Northern State Prison housed 2,615 inmates.

References

Buildings and structures in Newark, New Jersey
Prisons in New Jersey
1987 establishments in New Jersey